Nanmengcun is a village in Zhangqiu District, Shandong, China. It is located on Highway S321, approximately 3 km east of Gaoguanzhai Town, 15 km (14 mi) northeast of Jinan Yaoqiang International Airport. The population of Nanmengcun is 985.

References 

Jinan
Villages in China